The Inter-Services Public Relations (ISPR), is the media and PR wing of the Pakistan Armed Forces. It broadcasts and coordinates military news and information to the country's civilian media and the civic society.

The ISPR directorate serves the purpose of aiming to strengthen public relations with the civic society, and civil society through interacting with the media. The directorate also works as the principle voice of the Pakistan's military, with its director-general serving as the official spokesperson of the armed forces. In addition, the ISPR provides funds to assist produce pro-military public relations media.

Overview

The Directorate of the Inter–Services Public Relations (ISPR) was established in 1949 with army colonel Shahbaz Khan becoming its first director-general. The ISPR operates as a unified public relations system for the Pakistan's military, which combined army, air force, navy, and marines. The ISPR manage the public relations requirement of the armed forces, and is staffed with the combined personnel of the military along with civilian officers. It functions at the Joint Staff Headquarters (JS HQ) and plays an important role for gathering a national support for the armed forces at the public level. The ISPR also aims to strengthen support for the military's assigned contingency operations while undermining the perceived stature of the adversary.

In views of US army colonel John Adache, the ISPR interfaces between the armed forces, civil media, and the civic society.  Furthermore, the ISPR also formulates the media policy of the unified armed forces, and aims to safeguard the military interests of the armed forces from negative sentiment. The ISPR also monitors international and domestic media, surveying the nature of international reporting regarding Pakistan's military issues.

On a regular basis, the ISPR broadcasts televised news regarding the strategic operations in foreign and domestic areas. In Pakistan's military staff appointments and assignments, the ISPR is often perceived as one of the most prestigious directorates of Pakistan Armed Forces.

Its executive authority, a director-general, is a chief military spokesperson of the Pakistan Armed Forces who reports to Chairman of Joint Chiefs of Staff Secretariat; Chief of Army Staff as well the head also directly report to Chief of Air Staff, Commandant of Marines, and the Chief of Naval Staff.

Operations
The ISPR directorate is staffed with combined personnel of Pakistan's unified military along with civilian bureaucrats and officials. The ISPR functioned at the JS HQ and responsible for garnering national support for the armed forces as well as strengthen their resolve to accomplish the assigned mission while undermining the will of the adversary.

It also acts as an interface between the armed forces, the media and the public. It formulates much of the media policy of Pakistan's military, safeguards the armed forces from negative influences and monitors both international and domestic media.

It is likely that the army is planning the further expansion of ISPR to counter negative propaganda against the state and armed forces by international powers and their funded domestic media campaigns, in ongoing operation against terror outfits and economic terrorism.
That's why, for the first time in its history ISPR was being led by a three-star general,
Lt-General Asim Saleem Bajwa.

Principal media network

On regular basis, the ISPR release televised press releases on regarding the ongoing military exercises, and notified the civilian media about the ingenious strategic arsenal testings.

Apart from functioning as the public relations body of the armed forces, the ISPR handles exclusive dissemination of information regarding Pakistan's ongoing military contingency operations.

Controversies 
In recent years, there have been accusations of ISPR going beyond its domain and meddling in media affairs to undermine democracy. Concerns have been raised on ISPR handling media channels such as Bol TV and Pak TV and radio stations such as FM 89.04, FM 96.00 to indoctrinate pro-military narrative.

ISPR has regularly been criticized for posting inflammatory tweets on their official Twitter account. In April 2017, Lieutenant Gen Asif Ghafoor (a BPS-21 officer) posted a tweet 'rejecting' Prime Minister's directives to probe Dawn Leaks controversy. After huge public outcry over the choice of words, ISPR had to redact its earlier tweet.

Media productions 

Since the 1990s, the ISPR has been producing miniseries, drama, and films on military fiction. The first ISPR drama was Sunehray Din which was released in 1991. Some of the most famous dramas of ISPR include Ehd-e-Wafa, Waar, Shahpar, Ek Thi Marium and Sinf-e-Aahan. Apart from dramas, the ISPR has also released many songs with the first one being titled "Rang Layega Shaheedon Ka Lahoo" which was released in 2009. ISPR has also released documentary films with the first one being The Glorious Resolve, released in 2011. ISPR is well known for its media productions.

List of ISPR Director Generals

See also
 Media of Pakistan
 Pakistan Armed Forces

References

External links

ISPR Official website

 
Military of Pakistan
1947 establishments in Pakistan
Government agencies established in 1947
Military broadcasting